This is a list of the National Register of Historic Places listings in Duchesne County, Utah.

This is intended to be a complete list of the properties and districts on the National Register of Historic Places in Duchesne County, Utah, United States. Latitude and longitude coordinates are provided for many National Register properties and districts; these locations may be seen together in a map.

There are 38 properties and districts listed on the National Register in the county. 34 of these properties are archaeological sites in Nine Mile Canyon, and little is publicly made available about those sites beyond their names, almost all of which are given as Smithsonian trinomial codes. Another property was once listed but has been removed.



Current listings

|}

Former listing

|}

See also
 List of National Historic Landmarks in Utah
 National Register of Historic Places listings in Utah

References

External links

Duchesne